Christmas with Ivi Adamou (Greek: Χριστούγεννα με την Ήβη Αδάμου) is the second extended play by Greek Cypriot singer Ivi Adamou, released in Greece and Cyprus 22 November 2010 by Sony Music Greece. The album was subsequently released in the Netherlands and Portugal as Christmas with Ivi Adamou. The recordings are performed with the children's choir of Spiros Lambrou.

Track listing

Singles
"Santa Claus Is Coming To Town"

Personnel

Orchestration – Leonidas Tzitzos
Keys – Leonidas Tzitzos
Sound Record – Kostis Pirenis, Tasos Chamosfakidis at Workshop
Mixing – Dimitris (diji) Chorianopoulos at Workshop
Drums – Dimitris Chorianopoulos
Guitar – Spiros Spiliotopoulos
Vocals – Elena Patroklou
Featuring – The Spiros Lambrou choir
Photographer – Pavlos Euthimiou
Hair styling – Stefanos Vasilakis
Make up – Grigoris Pirpilis
Styling – Iris Leontari
Photo editing – Malvina Markopoulou
Artwork – Antonis Glikos

References

External links 
 Official Facebook Page

2010 EPs
Greek-language albums
Sony Music Greece EPs
Ivi Adamou albums
2010 Christmas albums
Christmas albums by Cypriot artists
Pop Christmas albums